Daniel Nestor and Nenad Zimonjić were the defending champions, but they lost in the final against Bob and Mike Bryan 3–6, 4–6.

Seeds
All seeds receive a bye into the second round.

Draw

Finals

Top half
{{16TeamBracket-Compact-Tennis3-Byes
| RD1=First round
| RD2=Second round
| RD3=Quarterfinals
| RD4=Semifinals
| RD1-seed03=WC
| RD1-team03=
| RD1-score03-1=62
| RD1-score03-2=4
| RD1-score03-3= 
| RD1-seed04= 
| RD1-team04=
| RD1-score04-1=7
| RD1-score04-2=6
| RD1-score04-3= 
| RD1-seed05= 
| RD1-team05=
| RD1-score05-1=6
| RD1-score05-2=5
| RD1-score05-3=[8]
| RD1-seed06= 
| RD1-team06=
| RD1-score06-1=2
| RD1-score06-2=7
| RD1-score06-3=[10]
| RD1-seed11= 
| RD1-team11=
| RD1-score11-1=2
| RD1-score11-2=5
| RD1-score11-3= 
| RD1-seed12=ALT
| RD1-team12=
| RD1-score12-1=6
| RD1-score12-2=7
| RD1-score12-3= 
| RD1-seed13= 
| RD1-team13=
| RD1-score13-1=4
| RD1-score13-2=2
| RD1-score13-3= 
| RD1-seed14= 
| RD1-team14=
| RD1-score14-1=6
| RD1-score14-2=6
| RD1-score14-3= 
| RD2-seed01=1
| RD2-team01=
| RD2-score01-1=6
| RD2-score01-2=6
| RD2-score01-3= 
| RD2-seed02= 
| RD2-team02=
| RD2-score02-1=4
| RD2-score02-2=3
| RD2-score02-3= 
| RD2-seed03= 
| RD2-team03=
| RD2-score03-1=0
| RD2-score03-2=6
| RD2-score03-3=[4]
| RD2-seed04=6
| RD2-team04= Ł Kubot O Marach
| RD2-score04-1=6
| RD2-score04-2=3
| RD2-score04-3=[10]
| RD2-seed05=3
| RD2-team05=

Bottom half

External links
Main Draw

Mutua Men's Doubles
MD